The 1960–61 Irish Cup was the 81st edition of the premier knock-out cup competition in Northern Irish football. 

Glenavon won the cup for the 3rd time, defeating the holders Linfield 5–1 in the final at Solitude.

Results

First round

|}

Replay

|}

Quarter-finals

|}

Replay

|}

Second replay

|}

Semi-finals

|}

Final

References

External links
The Rec.Sport.Soccer Statistics Foundation - Northern Ireland - Cup Finals

Irish Cup seasons
1960–61 in Northern Ireland association football
1960–61 domestic association football cups